Shan Goshorn (July 3, 1957 – December 1, 2018) was an Eastern Band Cherokee artist, who lived in Tulsa, Oklahoma. Her interdisciplinary artwork expresses human rights issues, especially those that affect Native American people today. Goshorn used different media to convey her message, including woven paper baskets, silversmithing, painting, and photography. She is best known for her baskets with Cherokee designs woven with archival paper reproductions of documents, maps, treaties, photographs and other materials that convey both the challenges and triumphs that Native Americans have experienced in the past and are still experiencing today.

Early life
Goshorn was born on July 3, 1957, and raised in Baltimore, Maryland. She spent summers on the Qualla Boundary with her grandmother. She found most of her artistic inspiration in her teenage years when she worked for a summer at her tribe's Qualla Arts and Crafts Mutual cooperative in Cherokee, North Carolina. There, she became familiar with leading Eastern Band Cherokee artists and art forms. This experience led to a job with the Indian Arts and Crafts Board, where she helped organize Native art exhibitions and photographed the harvesting and preparation raw materials for Cherokee basketmaking, carving, and other cultural art forms.

After Goshorn graduated from college, the U.S. Department of the Interior's Indian Arts and Crafts Board commissioned her to illustrate 20 Cherokee basket patterns in pen and ink. These drawings taught her the math and rhythm of basket weaving and convinced her that she could weave a basket but she did not try until 2008, when she wove her first basket from paper splints.

Education
Goshorn attended the Cleveland Institute of Art in Ohio because of their silversmithing department. She was the only Native American student in the program and did not find support in exploring Native American customary arts. Goshorn left the Cleveland Institute of Art and went to the Atlanta College of Art where she finished her Bachelor of Fine Arts. She found inspiration upon discovering American Indian Art Magazine and artists such as Fritz Scholder (Luiseño) and T.C. Cannon (Kiowa/Caddo). After these discoveries, Goshorn moved to Tulsa, Oklahoma, in 1981 to start her career.

Collections

Baskets
Goshorn wove more than 200 baskets from 2009 to 2018. The Museum of the Cherokee Indian identified her as the 14th living Eastern Band Cherokee to master the difficult double-weave technique. Goshorn also modeled some of her baskets after those that would have had specific uses in the tribal community.  

Before her focus on baskets, Goshorn's work consisted largely of drawings, paintings, photography and hand-tinted photography. With her work, Goshorn presented historical and current issues with the portrayal of Native American people.

Goshorn's work is in the collection of the National Museum of the American Indian, the Denver Art Museum, the Museum of Contemporary Native Arts in Santa Fe, N.M., the Museum of the Cherokee Indian in Cherokee, N.C., and the North American Native Museum in Zurich. Her work is also in the collection of the Renwick Gallery and was included in their 50th Anniversary show This Present Moment: Crafting a Better World.

Molly McGlennen writes of Goshorn's baskets that they "reveal Indigenous versions of history, which necessarily uncover – rather than enshroud -- the chasms of division between Native and non-Native peoples."

Honest Injun
Honest Injun is one of Goshorn's series that addresses human rights issues specific to Native Americans. She chose a multitude of hand-tinted, black-and-white images of brands that use Indian images and names to sell their product. This collection was made in response to America's quincentennial celebration of Christopher Columbus' discovery of the Americas.

Reclaiming Cultural Ownership; Challenging Indian Stereotypes
This collection consisted of 36 black-and-white documentary style images of Native American people living every day life. This series worked to challenge the way that Indian people are portrayed by the media.

Art career 
Goshorn belonged to the art collective, the Urban Indian Five, along with Gerald Cournoyer (Oglala Lakota), Brent Greenwood (Chickasaw/Ponca), Thomas Poolaw (Kiowa), and Holly Wilson (Delaware Nation/Cherokee). The intertribal group of artists were interested in exploring art's ability to help Native people overcome historical trauma. They exhibited works in Indian Health Services facilities.

After her first double-weave work, Goshorn was awarded multiple fellowships and her work has been displayed in collections such as the National Museum of the American Indian (Smithsonian Institution, Washington DC), Gilcrease Museum (OK), IAIA Museum of Contemporary Native Arts (NM), CN Gorman Museum (UC Davis, CA), Minneapolis Institute of Art (MN), Eiteljorg Museum of American Indians and Western Art (IN), and the Museum of the Cherokee Indian (NC). Goshorn received a 2013 Eiteljorg Contemporary Art Fellowship, 2013 Smithsonian Artist Research Fellowship, 2013 SWAIA Discovery Fellowship, the 2014 Native Arts and Cultures Foundation Fellowship and the 2015 United States Artists Fellowship.

Death 
Shan Goshorn died on December 1, 2018, from cancer at the age of 61. She is survived by her husband Tom Pendergraft; her mother, Edna Goshorn; two sisters; her son, Loma Pendergraft; daughter,  Neosha Pendergraft; and three stepdaughters, Natalee, Carolee, and Sommer. After her death, SWAIA issued the statement: "The Native art world has lost a giant. Shan Goshorn was one of a kind, much like her art."

Notes

External links
 Famed EBCI Artist Named USA Fellow
 Art Talk with Visual Artist Shan Goshorn
 Story Weaver
 Shan Goshorn at Heard Museum Guild Indian Fair and Market 2013 (video)
 Oklahoma Native Artists Oral History Project -- OSU Library
 Shan Goshorn, Urban Indian 5

1957 births
2018 deaths
Artists from Baltimore
Artists from Tulsa, Oklahoma
Atlanta College of Art alumni
Cherokee artists
Cleveland Institute of Art alumni
Eastern Band Cherokee people
Native American photographers
Native American women artists
Native American basket weavers
Painters from Oklahoma
Women basketweavers
Deaths from cancer in Oklahoma
20th-century Native Americans
21st-century Native Americans
20th-century Native American women
21st-century Native American women